Tetrahydrocannabihexol (Δ9-THCH, Δ9-Parahexyl, n-Hexyl-Δ9-THC) is a phytocannabinoid, the hexyl homologue of tetrahydrocannabinol (THC) which was first isolated from Cannabis plant material in 2020 along with the corresponding hexyl homologue of cannabidiol, though it had been known for several decades prior to this as an isomer of the synthetic cannabinoid parahexyl. Another isomer Δ8-THCH is also known as a synthetic cannabinoid under the code number JWH-124, though it is unclear whether this occurs naturally in Cannabis, but likely is due to Delta-8-THC itself being a degraded form of Delta-9-THC.

See also 
 Cannabidiphorol
 Tetrahydrocannabiorcol
 Tetrahydrocannabivarin
 Tetrahydrocannabutol
 Tetrahydrocannabiphorol

References 

Cannabinoids
Benzochromenes